Richard Breaden (1944–2014) was an Australian rugby league footballer who played in the 1960s.

Breaden played three seasons of first grade with St. George Dragons.  He was a big fast Front Row forward from the Sutherland Shire although his career was cut short by injury. He finished his career in Third Grade in 1970.  

Breaden died on 2 November 2014 at Engadine, New South Wales.

References

1944 births
2014 deaths
Rugby league players from Sydney
Rugby league props
St. George Dragons players
Australian rugby league players